Nemastylis, or pleatleaf, is a genus of flowering plants in the family Iridaceae, first described as a genus in 1835. It is native to Mexico, Central America, and the southern part of the United States. The genus name is derived from the Greek words nema, meaning "thread", and stylos, meaning "pillar" or "rod".

 Species
 Nemastylis floridana Small - Florida
 Nemastylis geminiflora Nutt. - south-central United States
 Nemastylis nuttallii Pickering ex R.C. Foster - Texas, Oklahoma, Arkansas, Missouri
 Nemastylis selidandra Ravenna - Texas
 Nemastylis tenuis (Herb.) S.Watson - Mexico, Guatemala, Honduras, Texas, Arizona
 Nemastylis tuitensis (Aarón Rodr. & Ortiz-Cat.) Ravenna - Jalisco State in Mexico

 formerly included
 Nemastylis pearcei Baker = Tigridia pearcei (Baker) Ravenna
 Nemastylis mcvaughii Molseed & Cruden = Tigridia convoluta (Ravenna) Goldblatt

References

Iridaceae
Iridaceae genera